Ruse Airport , also known as Shtraklevo (Щръклево) after the village located to the north, is a former military and passenger airport located about 20 km south of the city of Ruse, Bulgaria. It is currently open, but with an active license for small passenger and cargo flights (license issued on 21.12.2016).

History 
The airport was established in 1967 as a training site for pilots from the Bulgarian Air Force. The airport was named 11th Air Base "Shtraklevo" and equipped with Aero L-29 Delfin coming from Dolna Mitropoliya Airport. It was used by Balkan Bulgarian Airlines for its domestic flights to Sofia Airport, but with the end of the communist era in Bulgaria, domestic flights weren't profitable, due to lack of government funding. It served as a training base until 1998, when it ceased military operations and was finally abandoned in 1999.

Developing 
The government of Bulgaria decided to grant concession of some of its international airports, but the first procedure in late 2007 wasn't successful, although there was interest from the Swiss investor Ferdinand Prisi and the Bulgarian company Prista Oil. The government decided to make a new bid for the airport of Ruse, the new concourse should take place in the middle of December 2007, but later postponed it to unknown date.

In mid-October 2014, the Ministry of Transport decided to grant the ownership of the airport to Ruse Municipality. The idea was approved by the municipality Councilors and the finalization of the deal was expected to occur in early November 2014. The airport's manager, Nikolay Gorchev, stated in an interview that when the deal was completed, an application for license for aviation activities would be made.

The Bulgarian government transferred ownership of the property in Shtraklevo village, as well as its stake in the airport to Ruse municipality on 17 December 2014. The procedure was finalized on 4 February 2015  and the airport is currently officially owned by Ruse municipality. From 2017, the airport is open for small passenger and cargo aircraft.

Airlines and destinations 
There are currently no services to and from Ruse Airport.

See also
List of Bulgarian Air Force bases
List of Bulgarian military bases
28th Air Detachment
Bulgaria
Military of Bulgaria
The Bulgarian Cosmonauts
List of joint US-Bulgarian military bases

References 

Defunct airports
Airports in Bulgaria
Airport
Buildings and structures in Ruse Province